Holker may refer to:

People 
Allison Holker (born 1988), American dancer
John Holker QC (1828–1882), British lawyer and politician
John Holker (Jacobite) (1719–1786), English Jacobite soldier, industrialist and industrial espionage agent
Steven Holker (born 1995), British rugby league player

Places in England 
Lower Holker, civil parish in Cumbria
Holker, Cumbria, a hamlet
Holker Hall, country house in Cumbria
Holker Street, sports stadium in Barrow-in-Furness, Cumbria

See also
Holkar, an Indian dynasty
Holkar State, a royal state in India ruled by the Holkar